= Sultan Al-Saud =

Saudi Arabian footballer

Personal information
- Full name: Sultan Al-Saud
- Date of birth: 1985 (age 40–41)
- Place of birth: ??, Saudi Arabia
- Height: 1.84 m (6 ft 1/2 in)
- Position: Striker

Youth career
- ????–2003: Al-Hilal

Senior career*
Years	Team	Apps	(Gls)
2003–2009	Al-Hilal		
- * Club domestic league appearances and goals

Sultan Al-Saud is a football player for Al-Hilal in the Saudi Premier League.
